Paul Hays is a former Reading Clerk of the United States House of Representatives, a face familiar to viewers of C-SPAN, the network which covers House proceedings.  The reading clerk reads bills, motions, and other papers before the House and keeps track of changes to legislation made on the floor.  During the vote for Speaker at the beginning of each Congress, or when the electronic voting system fails, the clerk calls the roll of members for voting viva voce.  Hays joined the House in 1966 and became Republican reading clerk in 1988 at the nomination of Minority Leader Robert H. Michel of Illinois.

His parents met while at George Washington University, his father a native of Mississippi, and his mother a transplant from Kansas. Paul Hays was born in Washington D.C. Hays started his career in Washington as a Supreme Court Page.  He attended the Capitol Page School while he was a Page.  Hays's aunt taught at the Capitol Page School for many years. Hays's Democratic counterpart was Mary Kevin Niland, who remained a reading clerk until 2008.

Paul Hays retired as Reading Clerk on April 30, 2007. As the House met only in a pro forma session that day, the last day Hays actually assisted in legislative business was April 26.

References

External links
 Short profile in the Washington Post
 

Living people
Year of birth missing (living people)
Reading Clerks of the United States House of Representatives